In Greek mythology, the Epigoni or Epigonoi (from , meaning "offspring") are the sons of the Argive heroes, the Seven against Thebes, who had fought and been killed in the first Theban war, the subject of the Thebaid, in which Polynices and his allies attacked Thebes because Polynices' brother, Eteocles, refused to give up the throne as promised. The second Theban war, also called the war of the Epigoni, occurred ten years later, when the Epigoni, wishing to avenge the death of their fathers, attacked Thebes.

List of Epigoni 
According to the mythographer Apollodorus, they were:
 Aegialeus, son of Adrastus
 Alcmaeon, son of Amphiaraus
 Amphilochus, son of Amphiaraus
 Diomedes, son of Tydeus
 Euryalus, son of Mecisteus
 Promachus, son of Parthenopaeus
 Sthenelus, son of Capaneus
Thersander, son of Polynices

To this list, the geographer Pausanias also adds:
 Polydorus, son of Hippomedon
 Adrastus and Timeas, sons of Polynices

Hyginus also makes note of:
 Biantes and Tlesimenes, sons of Parthenopaeus

The war 
Both Apollodorus and Pausanias tell the story of the war of the Epigoni, although their accounts differ in several respects. According to Apollodorus, the Delphic oracle had promised victory if Alcmaeon was chosen their leader, and so he was. Aegialeus was killed by Laodamas, son of Eteocles, but Alcmaeon killed Laodamas. The Thebans were defeated and, by the counsel of the seer Teiresias, fled their city. However, Pausanias says that Thersander was their leader, that Laodamas fled Thebes with the rest of the Thebans, and that Thersander became king of Thebes.

As a poetic theme 
Epigoni was an early Greek epic on this subject; it formed a sequel to the Thebaid and therefore was grouped by Alexandrian critics in the Theban cycle. Some counted it not as a separate poem but as the last part of the Thebaid. Only the first line is now known:

Now, Muses, let us begin to sing of younger men ...

Epigoni was a lost Greek tragedy by Sophocles. A few lines from this text have long been known because they were quoted in commentaries and lexica by ancient scholars. An additional fragment of several lines was discovered in 2005.

In art 
There were statues of the Epigoni at Argos and Delphi.

Notes

References 
 Apollodorus, Apollodorus, The Library, with an English Translation by Sir James George Frazer, F.B.A., F.R.S. in 2 Volumes. Cambridge, Massachusetts, Harvard University Press; London, William Heinemann Ltd. 1921. Online version at the Perseus Digital Library.
 Herodotus; Histories, A. D. Godley (translator), Cambridge, Massachusetts: Harvard University Press, 1920; . Online version at the Perseus Digital Library.
 Pausanias, Pausanias Description of Greece with an English Translation by W.H.S. Jones, Litt.D., and H.A. Ormerod, M.A., in 4 Volumes. Cambridge, Massachusetts, Harvard University Press; London, William Heinemann Ltd. 1918. Online version at the Perseus Digital Library.
 Hyginus, Fabulae, Mary Grant (translator and editor), University of Kansas Publications in Humanistic Studies, no. 34. Online Version at ToposText.

External links 
 

 

de:Epigone